The Ambassador Extraordinary and Plenipotentiary of Ukraine to Peru is the ambassador of Ukraine to Peru. The current ambassador is Yuriy Polyukhovych. He assumed the position in 2022. 

The first Ukrainian ambassador to Peru assumed his post in 1999, the same year a Ukrainian embassy opened in Lima.

List of ambassadors

Ukraine
 2003–2006 
 2009–2013  (Charge d'Affairs)
 2013–2017 
 2017–2018 Vladyslav Bohorad (Charge d'Affairs)
 2018–2020 
 2020–2022 Rostyslav Volodymyrovych Yavorivskyi (Charge d'Affairs)
 Since 2022 Yuriy Polyukhovych

See also
List of ambassadors of Peru to Ukraine

References

External links 
  Embassy of Ukraine to Peru: Previous Ambassadors

 
Peru
Ukraine